Ratcatcher is a 1999 drama film written and directed by Lynne Ramsay. Set in Glasgow, Scotland, it is her debut feature film and was screened in the Un Certain Regard section at the 1999 Cannes Film Festival.

The film won its director numerous awards including the Carl Foreman Award for Newcomer in British Film at the BAFTA Awards, the Sutherland Trophy at the London Film Festival and the Silver Hugo for Best Director at the Chicago International Film Festival. Ratcatcher grossed $888,817 worldwide. It was released on DVD and Blu-ray by The Criterion Collection.

Overview
Ratcatcher is set in Glasgow, 1973. The city, despite its Victorian grandeur, has some schemes with the poorest housing conditions in western Europe, such as no running hot water, no bathing facilities, and no indoor toilets. The city is midway through a major re-development program, demolishing these schemes and re-housing the tenants in new modern estates. The problems in these schemes are somewhat compounded by the binmen going on strike, creating an additional health hazard and a breeding ground for rats. The main character, James, is a 12-year-old boy, growing up in one of these schemes, which is gradually emptying as the re-housed tenants move out. James, with the rest of his family, (two sisters, one older, one younger, his mum and heavy-drinking father), patiently wait to be re-housed.

Plot
The film opens focused upon James's friend Ryan Quinn, who is being forced to put on his gum boots to go to visit his father, who is in prison. Ryan chose to play with James instead, and runs off while his mother is not looking. Ryan meets James at the canal and during some rough-house play he is drowned, clearly with James bearing much of the blame for not having raised the alarm. James believes his inaction has gone unnoticed.

Ryan's family is eventually re-housed and on the day of leaving, Ryan's mother gives James the pair of brown sandals that she'd bought for Ryan on the day of his death.

The film follows the sensitive James as he tries to come to terms with his guilt, and make sense of the insensitive aspects of his environment.

James's one escape comes when he takes a bus to the end of the line and ends up in the outskirts of the city, where a new housing estate is under construction. He explores the half-built houses, and wonders in awe at the view from the kitchen window: an expansive field of wheat, blowing in the wind and reaching to the horizon. In a scene central to the film, he climbs through the window and escapes into the blissful freedom of the field.

James befriends a girl, Margaret Anne, whom he tries to help after her glasses are thrown into the canal by the local gang. James and Margaret Anne become close friends. She is his only other relief from his home environment. Margaret Anne has problems of her own, being abused by the local gang. The duo find comfort in each other's company.

One of James' friends, Kenny, receives a pet mouse as a birthday present. After the gang throw the mouse around in the air to make him "fly", Kenny ties the mouse's tail to a balloon, and the film shows it floating to the moon. Then, Kenny's mouse joins a whole colony of other mice frolicking on the moon.

Kenny later falls in the canal and is rescued by James' father, making him briefly into a local hero.

Though the military eventually comes and cleans up all the rubbish in the neighbourhood, James realises that his situation will most likely never change. He plunges himself into the canal, and a brief scene is shown, in which James and his family are moving into a new neighbourhood.

Cast
William Eadie as James Gillespie 
Tommy Flanagan as George Gillespie
Mandy Matthews as Anne Gillespie
Michelle Stewart as Ellen Gillespie
Lynne Ramsay Jr. as Anne Marie Gillespie
Leanne Mullen as Margaret Anne
John Miller as Kenny
Thomas McTaggart as Ryan Quinn
Jackie Quinn as Mrs. Quinn
James Ramsay as Mr. Quinn

Reception
Ratcatcher received generally positive reviews from critics. Review aggregator Rotten Tomatoes reports that 86% of 42 critics gave the film a positive review, for an average rating of 7.6/10. The site's critical consensus is that "Critics find Ratcatcher to be hauntingly beautiful, though its story is somewhat hard to stomach." Metacritic, which assigns a rating out of 100 to reviews from mainstream critics, has a "generally favorable" score of 76 based on 18 reviews.

Awards and nominations

References

External links
 
 
 
 
 
Ratcatcher an essay by Lizzie Francke at The Criterion Collection
Ratcatcher: A Flashlight Cinema an essay by Girish Shambu at The Criterion Collection
Ratcatcher: Spine Number 162 an essay by Barry Jenkins at The Criterion Collection
 

1999 films
1999 drama films
1999 independent films
Scottish films
British drama films
British coming-of-age films
English-language Scottish films
Scots-language films
Films about poverty in the United Kingdom
Films directed by Lynne Ramsay
Films scored by Rachel Portman
Georges Delerue Award winners
Films set in Glasgow
Films set in 1973
1999 directorial debut films
1990s English-language films
1990s British films